Alaid Island may refer to 
Atlasov Island in the Kuril Islands chain
Alaid Island (Alaska) in the Semichi Islands chain.